The 2014–15 UConn Huskies men's ice hockey team represented the University of Connecticut in the 2014–15 NCAA Division I men's ice hockey season. The team was coached by Mike Cavanaugh his second season behind the bench at UConn. The Huskies played their home games at the XL Center in downtown Hartford, Connecticut, competing in their first season in Hockey East.

Personnel

Roster

As of October 5, 2014.

Coaching staff

Standings

Schedule

Regular season

|-
!colspan=12 style=""| Exhibition

|-
!colspan=12 style=""| Regular Season

|-
!colspan=12 style=""|

Rankings

References

UConn Huskies men's ice hockey seasons
Connecticut Huskies
2014–15 NCAA Division I men's ice hockey by team
Connecticut
Connecticut